The Bonzos was the name of some Austrian agents the British recruited to prevent the destruction of many Old Masters collected by Adolf Hitler. He planned to destroy them if he lost World War II.

See also
Monuments, Fine Arts, and Archives program

External links
BBC Four Storyville documentary: The Bonzos

World War II espionage
Art and cultural repatriation after World War II